The 1926 Kentucky Derby was the 52nd running of the Kentucky Derby. The race was run on May 15, 1926.

Payout
The Kentucky Derby Payout Schedule

Field

 Winning Breeder: Idle Hour Stock Farm; (KY)

Margins – 5 lengths
Time – 2:03 4/5
Track – Fast
Horses Boot To Boot, Take A Change, Bolton, and Rasuli were scratched before the race.

References

Kentucky Derby races
Kentucky Derby, 1926
Derby
Kentucky Derby